Sabalia fulvicincta is a moth in the family Brahmaeidae (older classifications placed it in Lemoniidae). It was described by George Hampson in 1901.

References

Brahmaeidae
Moths described in 1901